Forever is the debut album by British boyband Damage. The album was released on 7 April  1997. The highest-charting single from the album was a cover of the Eric Clapton classic "Wonderful Tonight", which peaked at #3 on the UK Singles Chart. Other hits to feature on the album include the album's title track "Forever", "Love Guaranteed" and one of the band's signature songs, "Love II Love". The album was released on Big Life Records.

Track listing

Charts

Certifications

References

1997 debut albums
Damage (British band) albums